Parliamentary elections were held in Bulgaria on 25 April 1899. The result was a victory for the Liberal Party, which won 89 of the 169 seats. Voter turnout was 49.5%.

Results

References

Bulgaria
Parliamentary
Parliamentary elections in Bulgaria
Bulgaria